Resolving power is the capacity of an instrument to resolve two points which are close together.

Specifically, resolving power may refer to:

 Angular resolution
 Spectral resolution
 Optical resolution
 Resolution (mass spectrometry)

See also
Resolution (disambiguation)